Brontoscorpio is an extinct genus of scorpion. Remains of the only known species, Brontoscorpio anglicus, were discovered in the St. Maughan's Formation, Lochkovian-aged sandstone from Trimpley, Worcestershire. The species is characterized by the presence of single condyle and row of thick tubercles on the pedipalp free finger.

Ecology 
The remains were found in terrestrial sediments, showing evidence of Brontoscorpio being terrestrial. Brontoscorpio may have gone ashore to escape predation, but due to its size, it would have had difficulty supporting its weight on land and likely lived a primarily aquatic life.

Popular culture 
Brontoscorpio was featured in the first episode of the 2005 BBC television series Walking with Monsters. It is shown hunting Cephalaspis and being eaten by Pterygotus.

References 

Prehistoric scorpions
Paleozoic arachnids
Lochkovian life
Devonian arthropods
Devonian England
Fossils of England
Fossil taxa described in 1972